Richard McLean is an Australian illustrator writer, musician, artist and digital artist. He works as a graphic artist and illustrator for the Melbourne-based newspaper, The Age. He suffers from schizophrenia, the experience of which he often incorporates into his art. He often refers to himself as Richie Mclean to differentiate himself from the American artist of the same name.

A mental health advocate for many years with the likes of SANE Australia, The Mental Health Research Institute, The Dax Collection and others, he has completed a master's degree in education at Victoria University, Melbourne, with the exegesis and creative artifact available to see and download at http://www.theuniversalembrace.com 'The Universal Embrace', is the world's first interactive gay embrace that focuses on the physical, emotional, spiritual and politicised lenses.

His 2003 autobiography 'Recovered, Not Cured, a journey through schizophrenia', was awarded SANE Australias 'Book of the Year 2003' and was also awarded a 'Highly Commended' in the Human Rights and Equal Opportunities awards ceremonies the same year. A best seller for such a niche book, it can be sourced from http://www.recoverednotcured.com in iBook, ebook, physical copy or downloaded as an abridged audiobook version that was recorded by ABC National for the 'Life Matters' program. It was read by Richard in the first person.

He has completed his PhD with Victoria University in 2020, where he is entitled to be called as Doctor Richard McLean. His research focuses with ethical considerations and reflections of young people inheriting a world of Artificial Intelligence and Superintelligence enabling Trans Humanism.

Also a musician, he has played around Melbourne as a singer-songwriter and guitarist in bands 'Bravura', 'Less' and 'Welcome to Tuesday'. The latter band was a three-piece including his brother Brad McLean and his previous bass player Greg Kirby. The album was produced, recorded and mixed by Greg Kirby and Richard.

Bibliography
A Certain Beauty In Un-Resolution... ART; 
Recovered, Not Cured: A Journey Through Schizophrenia 
Strange Currencies of Ego and Soul, the visual language of Richard McLean 
 "The SHRINK ...and you thought you were crazy" 
 "Back to Basics; 50 Recent Drawings" 
 "Grogan the Monster in...What do you Love?"

References

Further reading
Strange Currencies of Ego and Soul, the visual language of Richard McLean 
 "The SHRINK ...and you thought you were crazy" 
 "Back to Basics; 50 Recent Drawings" 
 "Grogan the Monster in...What do you Love?" 
 "Artist profile from Makers of Melbourne" http://www.makersofmelbourne.com/blog/artist-profile-richard-mclean
 "A documentary on Richard's life and art from The Dax Collection" http://www.artfilms.com.au/Detail.aspx?ItemID=3692
 "Audiobook of 'Recovered, Not Cured, a journey through schizophrenia' recorded for ABC National" https://itunes.apple.com/au/album/recovered-not-cured...a-journey/id277325266
 "Richard's art, illustration and advocacy website" http://www.richmclean.com.au
 "Purchase 'Recovered, Not Cured, a journey through schizophrenia" http://www.recoverednotcured.com
 "Interview with 'The Drunken Boat'"  https://medium.com/drunken-boat/bright-lights-and-dark-corners-images-and-words-c2eddab222fe#.pm2h24yqk
 "Richards Masters of Education interactive website - the world's first 'interactive' gay embrace - focusing on the emotional, physical, spiritual and politicized lenses of two men embracing" http://www.theuniversalembrace.com
 "Richard's three-piece band 'Welcome to Tuesday' on iTunes" https://itunes.apple.com/us/album/sketches-from-clifton-hill/id656056633

Australian illustrators
Australian digital artists
Australian writers
1973 births
Living people